Section 79 of the U.S. Internal Revenue Code sets out the U.S. Federal income tax law concerning term life insurance plans provided by employers. Tax benefits are available for both employers and participating employees, under certain conditions.

Section 79 plans 
Section 79 details the tax consequences and requirements for employers wishing to install a group-term life insurance plan. Permanent life insurance may also be offered as an added benefit in a Section 79 plan. Section 79 plans are non-qualified as defined by the Internal Revenue Code, but still offer a tax deduction for sponsoring employers.

An employee must include in gross income for Federal income tax purposes an amount equal to the cost of group-term life insurance coverage on the employee's life to the extent that the cost of the coverage exceeds the sum of $50,000 plus the amount (if any) paid by the employee to purchase the coverage. Contributions to a Section 79 plan are tax-deductible, though for owner(s), and 2% or more shareholders, contributions are deductible only if paid by, and from, a C Corporation.

A Section 79 benefit program may allow the following benefits.

 The ability to purchase permanent life insurance with corporate dollars
 Deduct all of the cost to the C corporation as a business expense
 Allow the transfer of corporate dollars to the business owner on a tax-favored basis
 Grow the money in the plan in a tax-deferred setting
 Access to money in the plan can be achieved through policy loans on a tax-deferred basis
 Death benefits can pass to heirs on an income tax-free basis.
 There are no regulatory limits on funding for the key participants
 May provide asset protection by removing plan assets from the reach of company creditors
 Provides for minimal rank and file employee cost
 Insurance cash values may provide tax-free income as long as the policy is kept in force and withdrawals do not exceed the cost basis

A section 79 plan may be used for the following applications
 Group life insurance benefits
 Deductible insurance to fund estate planning needs of the business owner
 Deductible insurance to provide personal life insurance needs for the owner
 Deductible insurance to fund a buy-sell agreement or key man policy
 Future business buyout on a tax-advantaged basis

Determining the death benefit
Death benefits can be determined by a number of different methods at the discretion of the employee: from a minimum coverage of group term insurance to a permanent benefit up to a pre-determined multiple of the employee's reported W-2 income. The tax consequences and funding commitment to the employee will be impacted by the option they choose within the plan. In the case of an employee making $245,000, if a 10× multiple is used, that employee will receive a death benefit equal to $2,450,000 ($245,000 × 10). The resulting contribution depends heavily on what product is being used for funding, as well as the employee's age and health.

Calculating the tax liability
In a non-discriminatory Section 79 plan, the first $50,000 of coverage is provided free to all employees. Any group coverage over this amount is deemed a benefit for which the employee must pay. The pure insurance portion is factored using the Internal Revenue Service (IRS) published Table I rates  (scroll to page 5). If using permanent insurance the portion calculated as the 'permanent benefit' takes into account premium(s) paid, accumulated and cash surrender value, and other policy factors.

Requirements
There are generally four main conditions which must be met when installing a Section 79 plan:
 The plan must provide a death benefit excludable from income under Code section 101(a)
 Must be provided to a group of employees
 Must be provided under a policy carried directly or indirectly by the employer
 Maximum death benefits for each employee based on a multiple of compensation

Non-discriminatory
In order for a Section 79 plan to maintain its non-discriminatory form other conditions must be met:
 Cover at least 70% of employees
 No more than 15% of the participants are key employees
 Benefits based on reasonable classifications

Discriminatory
It is possible to have what is deemed a discriminatory Section 79 plan. Under a discriminatory plan the first $50,000 of death benefit coverage is not free for owners and key employees. Cost will again be based on the IRS Table I rates. Rank and file employees maintain their free benefit whether or not the plan is discriminatory.

Yet another set of requirements comes into play if the company has less than 10 employees.

Under 10 employees
 Employees with less than six months of full-time employment may be excluded
 Benefits must be based on a uniform percentage of compensation or coverage brackets, such that no bracket is more than 2.5 times the next lowest bracket and the lowest bracket is at least 10% of the highest bracket

With 10 or more employees

Excluded employees
 Employees with less than 36 months of full-time employment may be excluded
 Employees under the age of 18 or over the age of 64
 Part-time or seasonal employees
 Employees covered under a union contract, provided the group term life insurance benefits were the subject of good faith bargaining
 Anyone not medically approved
 Anyone choosing to opt out

Coverage for spouses and dependents
The cost of employer-provided group-term life insurance on the life of an employee's spouse or dependent, paid by the employer, is not taxable to the employee if the face amount of the coverage does not exceed $2,000. This coverage is excluded as a de minimis fringe benefit.
Some cases may allow more.

Notes

References

 The Group Life Insurance Handbook, Darlene K. Chandler, J.D., CLU, ChFC, The National Underwriter Company, 1997
 Planning for Business Owners and Professionals, Ted Kurlowicz, James Ivers III, John J. McFadden, The American College, 2003
 Section 79, IRC
 Treasury Reg 1.79
 Diminimus Fringe Benefits -Notice 89-110 / IRC Sec 132(e)

0079
Corporate taxation in the United States
Life insurance